The Transboundary Watershed Region is a region of northwest British Columbia and southeast Alaska that includes the Tatshenshini-Alsek, Chilkat, Chilkoot, Skagway, Taiya, Taku, Iskut-Stikine, Unuk, and Whiting watersheds.

The land and rivers within these watersheds support populations of wildlife including: grizzly and black bears, moose, caribou, mountain goats, sheep, wolves, and rare migratory birds. The major rivers of the region are abundant with wild Pacific salmon.

The "Transboundary Watershed Region" remains home to the Tlingit, Tahltan, Haida, Champagne-Aishihik and Carcross-Tagish First Nations, among others.

References

 First Nations (B.C.)
 http://www.riverswithoutborders.org Rivers Without Borders

Drainage basins of North America